Ramsey is one of two railroad stations operated by New Jersey Transit in the borough of Ramsey, Bergen County, New Jersey, United States. Located on the Main Line and Bergen County Line, Ramsey station is also unofficially known as Ramsey – Main Street due to the opening of Ramsey Route 17 station to the north in 2004.

History

Railroad service to the Ramsey section of Hohokus Township began on October 19, 1848. The Paterson and Ramapo Railroad began service between Jersey City and Suffern, where connection was made to the Erie Railroad main line. The station was built on land donated by Peter J. Ramsey, a local landowner. The Erie Railroad, who took over service, built a new depot at Ramsey in 1868, making it the oldest active passenger depot for commuter service in the state of New Jersey. (Service at the Long-a-Coming Depot in Berlin, which is older than 1868, ended in the 1960s).

Station layout
This station has two tracks, each with a low-level side platform, and a small parking lot on the south side of Main Street (County Route 2). The station is compliant with the Americans with Disabilities Act of 1990.

See also
National Register of Historic Places listings in Bergen County, New Jersey
List of the oldest buildings in New Jersey

References

External links

Turn of the century postcard of the train station
 Station from Main Street from Google Maps Street View

NJ Transit Rail Operations stations
Railway stations in the United States opened in 1848
Ramsey, New Jersey
Former Erie Railroad stations
Railway stations in Bergen County, New Jersey
1848 establishments in New Jersey